American Motorcyclist is an American magazine published monthly by the American Motorcyclist Association, covering issues of importance to its members, including legislation and regulations, touring, trail riding, motocross, enduros, road racing, cruisers and dirt track.

Since April 2013, the magazine has published a second version that focuses on off-highway riding and competition.

Circulation 
The magazine is sent free of charge to members of the American Motorcyclist Association, and the current issue is available to members free online. The magazine is not sold on news stands. Members can access a complete catalog of back issues in PDF format for free on the website www.americanmotorcyclist.com.

Contributors
American Motorcyclist has many freelance contributors, including Tom Mehren, Davey Morgan, Jeff Kardas, Gabe Ets-Hokin, and Conrad Lim.

References

Motorcycle magazines published in the United States
Monthly magazines published in the United States
Magazines established in 1947
Magazines published in Ohio